TV Roskosmos ( - TeleStudio of Roskosmos) is the television station of the Russian Federal Space Agency. The channel and studio is managed by Alexander Nikolayevich Ostrovsky. Unlike its United States counterpart, NASA TV, it does not operate 24 hours a day. When available, TV Roskosmos is streamed live over YouTube. During coverage related to the International Space Station, NASA TV will sometimes carry Roskosmos TV segments with English voiceover translation.

Roscosmos TV-Studio is a TV production studio, affiliated within the structure of Roscosmos, producing and promoting documentaries that highlight the most timely and historic events of the national space industry in Russia and abroad. The Studio's films, programmes and reports dwell on cutting-edge space equipment and people participating in space programmes including scientists, designers, cosmonauts. Video materials devoted to the history of Soviet and Russian cosmonautics touch upon the issues of astronomy and planetology.

History 
The television studio of Roscosmos was organised on 11 January 2005. Since that time there have been produced more than 15 documentaries all of which were broadcast on the Russian national central TV channels.

Since July 2006 round-the-clock news channel Vesti has been weekly broadcasting Roscosmos TV-Studio's programme News of Cosmonautics which efficiently highlights the most up-to-date achievements of Russian cosmonautics. Since September 2008 the programme has been anchored by the space pilot Fyodor Yurchikhin. From April 2010 on the TV-Studio's almanac-programme Russian Space is aired on the educational channel My Planet.

In March 2008 in the web-portal Vesti.Ru, in the framework of a joint project of the Russian information channel Rossiya 24 and Roscosmos TV-Studio has been initiated a new chapter Kosmonavtika (Cosmonautics). The project's uniqueness consists in the fact that it provides a wide range of public with a direct access to exclusive photo and video data, including live broadcasts of spacecraft's lift-offs from the Cosmodrome Baikonur.

TV-Studio produces video presentations intended to promote the national space industry on world aerospace shows and exhibitions, as well as commercial films on request of Roscosmos enterprises. From March 2007 until March 2009 there was aired the joint weekly programme devoted to cosmonautics Poyekhali on the radio station Zvezda FM. Since November 2009 radio Voice of Russia (Golos Rossii) has been broadcasting the joint programme Space Wednesday. In 2007 the Studio began its regular participation in domestic and international television contests.

On 12 April 2008 in the Internet's Russian segment appeared the Roscosmos TV-Studio's website.

Staff 
Chief Executive of Roscosmos TV-Studio is Alexander Ostrovsky. The Studio's staff is composed of editors, correspondents and cameramen possessing a rich professional experience of working on the Russian national central television.

Films 
The TV-Studio produces:
weekly news programme Cosmonautics on the Russian information channel Rossiya 24
weekly TV-almanac Russian Space on TV-Channel Rossiya 2 and educational satellite channel My Planet
documentaries
commercial videos
space related video presentations

Awards 
For the documentary Hydrospace. Dive to Fly Up the film crew of Roscosmos TV-Studio was awarded with the prize Minor Gold Dolphin on the VI International Festival of Underwater Shooting Gold Dolphin 2007.

In December 2007 the documentary film He Could Have Been the First One. Cosmonaut's Nelyubov Drama won in the international contest and obtained a national award “Lavr” (“Laurel”) in the field of documentary cinematograph and television in the nomination for the “best popular-science film”.

In May 2008 Roscosmos TV-Studio's film White Sun of Baikonur stood third in the nomination For Faith and Fidelity on the III International Television Festival Won Together  which took place on 7–12 May 2008 in Sevastopol.

In April 2009 the Roscosmos TV-Studio's website won a prize of the contest Stars of AstroRunet-2008. It stood third both in the nominations Breakthrough of the Year (the best novice website) and Best Official Cosmonautics Related Website, along with the site of the Russian Mission Control Centre (TsUP-M)

The Roscosmos TV-Studio's documentary StartNo.100. Union of Titans (directed by Alexey Kitaytsev) obtained the diploma and the special prize Fruit of Cognition on the IV International Festival of Popular-Science Films World of Knowledge which was held on 19–23 October 2009 in Saint-Petersburg.

In April 2010 the Roscosmos TV-Studio's website stood third in the contest Stars of AstroRunet-2009 (nominee for the Best Official Cosmonautics Related Website)

See also 
 ESA Television — The European space agency TV channel

External links 
 
 TV Roscosmos live stream on YouTube.com

Space program of Russia
Russian-language television stations in Russia
Television channels and stations established in 2005
Television channels of space agencies
Roscosmos